Banmédica is a private health insurance company from Chile.

References

Companies of Chile
Health care companies established in 1988
Chilean companies established in 1988
Companies listed on the Santiago Stock Exchange